The Cross diatreme is a diatreme in southeastern British Columbia, Canada, located  east of the Rocky Mountain Trench and  northeast of Elkford.

See also
Volcanism in Canada
List of volcanoes in Canada

References

Diatremes of British Columbia
Canadian Rockies